The 1999 UAE President's Cup Final was the 23rd final of the Emirati competition, the UAE President's Cup. The final was played at Al Nahyan Stadium, in Abu Dhabi, on 27 May 1999. Al Ain beat Al Shabab 1–0 to win their first title.

Match details

References

1999
Cup
Al Ain FC matches
Al Shabab Al Arabi Club matches